Lebesgue space may refer to:

 Lp space, a special Banach space of functions (or rather, equivalence classes of functions)
 Standard probability space, a non-pathological probability space